This is a list of clubs in the Bundesliga. It records all 56 clubs who played in the 58 seasons of the Bundesliga since its introduction in 1963. The placings section is split in two periods, before and after the German reunification, which took place during the league's 1990–91 season, in October 1990. For the following season, clubs from former East Germany joined the league.

List of clubs

The list of clubs of the Bundesliga from its inception to the present season, sorted by the number of seasons a club played in the league.

Key

Placings

Placings from 1963 to 1991
The placings in the Bundesliga from its interception to the last season before the German reunion:

Placings from 1991 to the present season
The placings in the Bundesliga from the German reunion to the present season:

Key for placings

 The two digit year is the year in which the season finishes.

References

External links

DFB – Deutscher Fußball Bund (German Football Association) 

Clubs
Bundesliga
 List
de:Liste der Vereine der Fußball-Bundesliga